The  Church of Our Lady of the Assumption It is a Latin Rite Catholic Church located in the city of Kursk, in the Archdiocese of European Russia, headquartered in Moscow (and whose archbishop is Monsignor Paolo Pezzi).

In 1859 the Catholic community of Kursk, most Polish or German origin, with more than a thousand faithful, asked permission to build a church. They previously met in a chapel. Once the funds were raised, it was granted permission and the church was begun in 1892 in neo-Gothic style. The church was under the patronage of Our Lady of the Assumption and was consecrated in 1896. It originally consisted of two towers at the ends of the facade and was built in red brick. The interior was decorated with beautiful mosaics.

The church was returned to the diocese its 110th anniversary in 2006 was celebrated in 1997.

See also
Roman Catholicism in Russia
Our Lady of the Assumption

References

German diaspora in Europe
Buildings and structures in Kursk
Polish diaspora in Russia
Roman Catholic churches completed in 1896
19th-century Roman Catholic church buildings in Russia
Cultural heritage monuments in Kursk Oblast
Objects of cultural heritage of Russia of regional significance